Jacques Lamoureux (born June 14, 1986) is an American professional ice hockey player who previously played for the Alaska Aces in the ECHL. A graduate of the United States Air Force Academy, he is also a contracting officer in the United States Air Force previously assigned to the 673rd Contracting Squadron at Joint Base Elmendorf-Richardson in Alaska Lamoureux is currently a major assigned as an instructor in the Department of Management at USAFA. Lamoureux is married with a stepson and daughter.

Prior to turning professional, Lamoureux played four years of NCAA's Division I college hockey in the Atlantic Hockey conference playing with the Air Force Falcons.

Family 
The Lamoureux family has six siblings who all play ice hockey at an elite level. Jacques older brother, Jean-Philippe, born 1984, is currently playing professional hockey in Austria with the EC Red Bull Salzburg. His younger brother, Pierre-Paul, born 1987, played three years of defense in the Western Hockey League with the Red Deer Rebels. His youngest brother, Mario, born 1988, was an NCAA forward at the University of North Dakota. His twin sisters Jocelyne and Monique, born 1989, both won silver medals with Team USA at the 2010 Winter Olympics and 2014 Winter Olympics, and gold in the 2018 Winter Olympics.

Awards and honors

References

External links

1986 births
Air Force Falcons men's ice hockey players
Northern Michigan Wildcats men's ice hockey players
Alaska Aces (ECHL) players
American men's ice hockey centers
Living people
Ice hockey people from North Dakota
Utah Grizzlies (ECHL) players
United States Air Force officers
United States Air Force Academy alumni
AHCA Division I men's ice hockey All-Americans
American people of French-Canadian descent